Antiques Road Trip (also known as Celebrity Antiques Road Trip) is a BBC television series produced by STV Studios. It was first shown on BBC Two from 2010 to 2012, and has been shown on BBC One since 2013. This show is not to be confused with Antiques Roadshow.

Format

Regular
In the programme two antiques experts compete against each other. They get a budget of £200 with which to buy antiques and collectibles, that are then sold at auction. After each auction, the amount in each expert's kitty after costs are deducted becomes their budget for the next leg. The winner is the expert who makes the greater profit over five legs, with whatever money is left in the kitty at the end being donated to the charity Children in Need. Each leg is a single programme, which are normally broadcast stripped from Monday to Friday. The experts travel to their different destinations in a classic car, which changes each week.

Celebrity Antiques Road Trip
A celebrity version Celebrity Antiques Road Trip has been airing since 2011, in which each expert is paired up with a celebrity and each programme is a self-contained contest held over a single leg.

Production
The series began as an ultimately unbroadcast pilot in August 2009. This original preliminary version saw the two experts – David Harper and Kate Bliss – each driving a classic car, and free to roam where they chose within a "work-day" time limit (9 a.m. to 5 p.m.) to buy up antiques with their £200 budget, with the goal of making the most profit when entered into auction two days later. They were encouraged to spend the entirety of their £200, even if it meant using any leftover on small antique trinkets, with potential penalty for not spending enough by deducting a percentage from profits. In this version, the experts only interacted at the outset of the episode and at the final auction, and the episode was 'self contained' - i.e. it wasn't part of a week-long trip. Potential was seen in the format for a series, but several tweaks were made. It was decided to have the two experts travel around together in the same car, allowing for interaction between the pair, and it was decided to make the 'road trip' span five days, and with a more designated overall route. The goal of spending the entire budget or being penalised, was also dropped. In the original pilot, each expert could nominate any proceeds to be donated to a charity of their choice; in the actual series Children in Need became the solo umbrella charity for any proceeds.

Filming of each episode of the series does generally take place within a single day, although the actual length of a day may be simulated, i.e. it may actually be filmed over several days, but within the timespan that a single day would allow. Although many episodes of the week-long trips are indeed filmed on subsequent days occasionally there may be a day's gap filming between some episodes, to allow the experts time to tend to their own auction businesses. The two included segments per episode where each expert will visit a local point of historical interest, are filmed a few days later, with the celebrities wearing the same clothes as in the rest of the episode so as not to break continuity.

Records
The records for the largest profit on a single item, the highest sale price for a single item, and the largest total profit on one road trip is held by Paul Laidlaw, who in the 2017 series bought a Chambre Automatique De Bertsch sub-miniature camera for £60 and sold it at auction for £20,000 (a 33,233% profit). The previous records for highest sale price for a single item and largest profit on a road trip was held by Anita Manning, who in 2016 purchased a Buddha statue for £50, which sold for £3,800 (a 7,500% profit).

The record for the largest profit margin on a single item is 33,650%. It was set by Charlie Ross when, in the 2012 series, he bought a chipped Staffordshire elephant clock for £8 which sold for £2,700. This was also the largest profit made on a single item until Manning broke that record in 2016.

Transmissions

Regular series

Celebrity series

References

External links
 
 
 
 Celebrity Antiques Road Trip
 

2020s British television series
2010 British television series debuts
Antiques television series
BBC Television shows
English-language television shows
Television series by STV Studios